Qizhen (?-303) was a chieftain of the Xianbei Duan tribe from 270 to 303. He succeeded Rilujuan as chieftain and was succeeded by Duan Wuwuchen.

References 
 ''Book of Wei, vol. 103.

3rd-century births
303 deaths
3rd-century Chinese people
4th-century Chinese people
Sixteen Kingdoms
Duan tribe